Wheeler Peak is the highest natural point in the U.S. state of New Mexico. It lies in the Sangre de Cristo Mountains, the southernmost subrange of the Rocky Mountains.

Formerly named Taos Peak, after the nearby town of Taos, New Mexico, it was renamed Wheeler Peak in 1950. A plaque at the summit states that the mountain was:

Named in honor of Major George Montague Wheeler (1832–1909) who for ten years led a party of surveyors and naturalists collecting geologic, biologic, planimetric and topographic data in New Mexico and six other southwestern states.

Nearby peaks and features 
Just north of Wheeler Peak is Mount Walter. It is sometimes mistaken for Wheeler Peak, since it is along the standard route to Wheeler. Lake Fork Peak at  lies just across Williams Lake and to the west of Wheeler Mountain.

Wheeler Peak is the focus of the  Wheeler Peak Wilderness area in the Carson National Forest. Much of the mountain area just south of the peak is on Taos Pueblo land. Some  was returned to the pueblo from the Carson National Forest in 1970
and another  in 1996.

Climbing 
The standard route on Wheeler Peak is along the north ridge. The route starts at the parking lot for Taos Ski Valley, and proceeds east along an old road to a broad saddle at Bull-of-the-Woods Meadow. It then turns south and winds its way among minor peaks and small valleys to gain Wheeler Peak from the north, going over the summit of Mount Walter along the way. This is a practical route, even in winter, due to low (but nonzero) avalanche exposure.

An alternate route is to hike south from Taos Ski Valley to Williams Lake, then take a newly constructed switchback trail to the top.  This trail was completed in 2011 by a Forest Service trail crew from the Gallatin National Forest, 8 people working 12 hours per day, building 4 miles of new trail with hand tools to the top in 14 days.  

Another alternate route is to begin from the nearby ski resort of Red River.  From the town of Red River drive 6.4 miles south on NM 578, then 1.3 miles on FR 58 to the trailhead parking area.  From the parking area Wheeler peak is about 7 miles on Forest Trail 91.  This route passes two alpine lakes, Lost Lake and Horseshoe Lake.

Wheeler Peak has a summit register as do many major western peaks.

See also

List of mountain peaks of North America
List of mountain peaks of the United States
List of U.S. states by elevation

References

External links

Mountains of New Mexico
Sangre de Cristo Mountains
Landforms of Taos County, New Mexico
Highest points of U.S. states
Carson National Forest
North American 4000 m summits
Mountains of Taos County, New Mexico